The National League Central is one of Major League Baseball's six divisions. This division was created in 1994, by moving two teams from the National League West (the Cincinnati Reds and the Houston Astros) and three teams from the National League East (the Chicago Cubs, the Pittsburgh Pirates, and the St. Louis Cardinals).

When the division was created in 1994, the Pirates were originally supposed to stay in the East while the Atlanta Braves were to be moved to the Central from the West. However, the Braves, wanting to form a natural rivalry with the expansion Florida Marlins, requested to remain in the East. Despite the Marlins offering to go to the Central, the Pirates instead gave up their spot in the East to the Braves. Since then, the Pirates have tried several times unsuccessfully to be placed back in the East.

In 1998, the NL Central became the largest division in Major League Baseball when the Milwaukee Brewers were moved in from the American League Central. In 2013, the Astros moved to the American League West.

This division has been dominated by the Cardinals, who have accounted for 12 of the 26 division championships, plus three wild card wins.  Aside from the Cardinals, the Cubs have the second most division championships with six, as well as three wild card wins. The Astros have four division titles and two wild card wins. The Reds have three division titles, along with one wild card win. The Brewers have three divisional championships, with two wild card wins. The Pirates have not won the division since the division was created, but possess three wild card wins. The 2013 win was the Pirates’ first playoff berth since 1992.

The current NL Central division champion is the 2022 St. Louis Cardinals, their twelfth division championship for the Cardinals, winning last in 2019.

Division membership

Current members
Chicago Cubs – Founding member; formerly of the NL East
Cincinnati Reds – Founding member; formerly of the NL West
Milwaukee Brewers - Since 1998; formerly of the AL West, AL East, AL Central
Pittsburgh Pirates – Founding member; formerly of the NL East
St. Louis Cardinals – Founding member; formerly of the NL East

Former member
Houston Astros – Founding member; formerly of the NL West; moved to the AL West in 2013

Division lineups

Place cursor over year for division champ or World Series team.

 Creation of division due to the 1994 realignment into three divisions (with Chicago, Pittsburgh and St. Louis from NL East, and Cincinnati and Houston from NL West)
 Milwaukee switched leagues due to the 1998 expansion, moving in from AL Central
 Houston switched leagues after the 2012 season, and joined the AL West

Champions by year

Team names link to the season in which each team played

§ – Due to the 1994–95 Major League Baseball strike on August 12, no official winner was awarded. Cincinnati was leading by half a game over Houston at the time of the strike.

* – The Astros and Cardinals finished with identical regular season records. Because the Astros won the season series 9–7 against the Cardinals, they were awarded the National League Central division title, and the Cardinals were declared the National League Wild Card team.

† – Due to the COVID-19 pandemic, the season was shortened to 60 games. By virtue of the eight-team postseason format used for that season, division runner-up St. Louis (30–28, .517) also automatically qualified for the playoffs.

National League Championships
The division has produced six National League Pennant winners: St. Louis in 2004, 2006, 2011 and 2013, Houston in 2005, and Chicago in 2016.

Other postseason teams

The wild card was introduced in 1994 and was initially assigned to the team with the best record in each league that did not win its division. The first year of implementation was 1995 as a player strike prematurely ended the 1994 season. Since implementation, each of the NL Central teams has won the wild card. In 2012, a second wild card was added to post-season play, and in 2022, a third was also added.

* – Defeated the San Francisco Giants in a one game playoff for the Wild Card, 5–3.

† – Finished with the same record as the Houston Astros, but Houston won the season series vs. the Cardinals that year, and were given the higher seed in the playoffs.

** –  From 2012 to 2019, and in 2021, the Wild Card was expanded to two teams. Those teams faced each other in the Wild Card Game to determine the final participant in the National League Division Series. In 2020 only, eight teams, including the three division winners, played in a best-of-three Wild Card Series, with the winners advancing to the Division Series. Starting in 2022, the Wild Card field was increased to three teams, and along with the lowest-ranked division winner, qualified for the Wild Card Series to determine the remaining two slots in the Division Series.

†† – Due to the COVID-19 pandemic, the season was shortened to 60 games.

*** – Finished with the same record as the San Francisco Giants but won the wild-card spot due to a superior intra-divisional record (Brewers went 19–21 vs. the NL Central while the Giants went 18–22 vs. the NL West).

Season results

Notes and Tiebreakers
 Chicago and San Francisco of the National League West were tied for the wild-card berth and played in a tie-breaker game. The Cubs won 5–3 to claim the wild-card spot.
 Cincinnati and New York of the National League East were tied for the wild-card berth and played in a tie-breaker game. The Reds lost 5–0 and were eliminated from postseason contention.
 St. Louis and Atlanta of the National League East were tied for the second and third seed, but the Cardinals claimed the second seed by winning the season series 4–3.
 Houston and St. Louis were tied for the division championship and wild-card berth, but the Astros claimed the division crown by winning the season series 9–7, relegating St. Louis to the wild-card spot.
 Milwaukee and Chicago were tied for the division championship and first wild-card berth and played in a tie-breaker game. The Brewers won 3–1 to claim the division crown, while the Cubs were relegated to the first wild-card spot.
 Milwaukee and San Francisco of the National League West were tied for the second wild-card berth, but the Brewers clinched the final postseason spot due to a superior intra-division record (Milwaukee had a 19–21 record while San Francisco had an 18–22 record).

NL Central titles won by team

* – Won division via tiebreakerItalics indicates former division member

See also
National League East
National League West
American League East
American League Central
American League West

References
MLB Final Standings By Year

External links
MLB Regular Season Standings

Major League Baseball divisions
Sports leagues established in 1994
1994 in baseball